On February 24, 2022, the Lithuanian authorities declared a state of emergency in the country due to the Russian invasion of Ukraine. Lithuanian President Gitanas Nauseda said that he condemned the aggression of the Russian Federation against Ukraine, and also said that after Russia started a war against Ukraine, NATO should clearly state that Russia is a serious threat to Euro-Atlantic security.

Background 
The day before the invasion, on February 23, a meeting was held in Kyiv between the presidents of Lithuania, Poland and Ukraine as part of the Lublin Triangle. The President of Lithuania, Gitanas Nauseda, expressed support for Ukraine from the Lithuanian side, saying that Ukraine will not be left alone with the threat.

During the Russian invasion of Ukraine (2022) 

During the Russian invasion of Ukraine, on February 24, 2022, a state of emergency was declared in Lithuania. On the same day, Nauseda recorded an appeal to the citizens of the Russian Federation:I appeal to all the people of Russia.

Your leaders have unilaterally decided to attack a neighboring country. To a country that has close historical and cultural ties with Russia. The people you call your brothers and sisters.

Nobody wants this war. Neither Russians, nor Ukrainians, nor the rest of the world.

It's not too late to stop this crime. It is not too late to prevent the death of thousands of innocent people. You can still avoid senseless casualties on both sides of the front.

In a song well known to all of us, it is said that the soldiers died in that war, so that the people of the whole earth could sleep peacefully at night. But now your country is starting a new war, the consequences of which are unknown to anyone. Do Russians want wars? I want to believe not.

Do not be silent! Don't close your eyes to injustice! Be bold and decisive!On February 24, Defense Minister Arvydas Anušauskas announced that, following the example of other NATO countries, Lithuania evacuated 40 of its military instructors from Ukraine who were training the Ukrainian military to use Stinger man-portable air defense systems from the batch transferred to Ukraine on February 13. On February 25, rallies in support of Ukraine were held in many large cities of Lithuania under the general title “Freedom Shines”. People walked along the main streets of Vilnius, gathered near the Seimas and in the square to them. Boris Nemtsov at the Russian embassy.

A number of Lithuanian online publications (LRT.lt, Delfi.lt, 15min.lt and Lrytas.lt, tv3.lt, Madeinvilnius.lt. VE.lt, Kaunas.kasvyksta.lt, Etaplius.lt) expressed their solidarity with Ukrainian journalists and editors working at the front, and inform them of their readiness to help  . On the same day, the rebroadcasting of the Russian state-owned TV channels RTR Planeta, Rossiya 24, NTV Mir, and Belarussian Belarus 24 (for five years), RBC and TVCI (for three years) was banned in Lithuania. ). Klaipeda radio station "Rainbow" also expressed solidarity by stopping broadcasting any Russian products.

On April 4, 2022, Lithuania decided to downgrade diplomatic relations with Russia "in response to Russia's military aggression against sovereign Ukraine and the atrocities committed by the Russian armed forces in various occupied Ukrainian cities, including the heinous massacre in Bucha." Lithuania expels the Russian ambassador, recalls its ambassador and closes the Russian consulate in Klaipeda.

On May 10, the Seimas of Lithuania, noting that the Russian military "deliberately and systematically choose civilian targets for bombing," recognized Russia as a "state supporting and carrying out terrorism," and its military actions against Ukraine - genocide of the Ukrainian people.

Proposal to cancel the recognition of the independence of the Republic of Lithuania 
On June 8, United Russia deputy Yevgeny Fedorov proposed to cancel the resolution of the USSR State Council "On the recognition of the independence of the Republic of Lithuania" of September 6, 1991. He submitted the relevant bill to the State Duma of Russia for consideration. Fedorov substantiates such a proposal by the fact that the USSR law "On the procedure for resolving issues related to the secession of a union republic from the USSR" was violated, since a referendum on secession from the USSR was not held in the Republic of Lithuania, and a transition period was not established for consideration all contentious issues. The deputy stated that the resolution of the State Council of the USSR is illegal, as it was adopted by an unconstitutional body and in violation of the requirements of a number of articles of the Constitution.

Restriction of transit communication with the Kaliningrad region 
In response to the proposal to cancel the recognition of Lithuanian independence, on June 18, the Lithuanian side introduced a ban on transit cargo transportation between the Russian Kaliningrad Oblast and the rest of Russia through the territory of Lithuania , covering goods subject to European Union sanctions imposed on Russia for its invasion of Ukraine . The restrictions came into force on June 18, 2022 and led to a ban on the transit of coal, metals, cement, timber, building materials and high-tech products through the Lithuanian territory by rail.

On June 21, restrictions were extended to trucks. A number of media called the measures taken by Lithuania "the blockade of Kaliningrad", prompting a response from Lithuanian Prime Minister Ingrida Simonyte, who emphasized that there was no question of a blockade and restrictions were imposed only on the movement of goods subject to EU sanctions. According to the governor of the Kaliningrad region Anton Alikhanov, 40-50% of all cargo was banned.

In response to the restrictions, Russia began to openly threaten Lithuania and even issue ultimatums. The head of the Lithuanian Foreign Ministry, Gabrielius Landsbergis , said that the ban on the transit of steel and ferrous metal products between the main territory of Russia and Kaliningrad Oblast of the Russian Federation through Lithuania is not a decision of Lithuania, but EU sanctions against Russia.

On July 13, EU representatives announced that Russia was allowed to transit goods subject to sanctions through the countries of the European Union by rail. This means that Russia can transit sanctioned goods to Kaliningrad via Lithuania and Poland. MEP Andrius Kubilius calls such a step extremely dangerous - the Kremlin, feeling that it can put pressure on the EC, is unlikely to stop and can only demand even greater concessions. Lithuanian Prime Minister Igrida Simonyte said that the Lithuanian side does not agree with this decision, but cannot oppose anything to the European Commission.

References 

2022 Russian invasion of Ukraine by country
Lithuania–Russia relations
Lithuania–Ukraine relations